Yigal Menahem (born 10 September 1963) is an Israeli former footballer who now works as a lawyer.

Personal life
Yigal's younger brother Shimon was a defender and both played together in Maccabi Netanya during the 1980s.

Honours
 Israeli Premier League runner-up: 1981-82
 League Cup/Toto Cup winner: 1983-84
 runner-up: 1986–87, 1988–89

External links
 
 

1963 births
Living people
Israeli Jews
Israeli footballers
Israel international footballers
Maccabi Netanya F.C. players
Hapoel Kfar Saba F.C. players
Hapoel Jerusalem F.C. players
Israeli lawyers
Liga Leumit players
Association football forwards